Martin E. Appel (born August 7, 1948), is an American public relations and sports management executive, television executive producer, and author.

Appel's career has included sports public relations (including as Public Relations Director for the New York Yankees), sports management, and serving as a television executive producer.  He has written over 20 books, including  Pinstripe Empire: The New York Yankees from Before the Babe to After the Boss, published in 2012, and Casey Stengel: Baseball’s Greatest Character, published in 2017.

Early life and education
Appel was born in Brooklyn, New York, and is Jewish.  His parents were Irving and Celia Appel.

He graduated from State University of New York at Oneonta in 1970. He obtained a degree in political science and journalism.

Sports public relations, sports management, and tv executive producer career
Appel began his career in baseball while a student, after writing to then-New York Yankees public relations chief Bob Fishel. Appel began his tenure with the Yankees in 1968 at age 19, handling fan mail for Mickey Mantle. In 1970, he became at 21 the Yankees Assistant Public Relations Director.  He was named Public Relations Director of the team in 1973 by Yankee owner George Steinbrenner, becoming at 23 the youngest PR Director in Major League Baseball history, and remained in that position for four years.<ref name=rivalry>David Waldstein (April 2, 2012). "Yankees and Mets Resuming Rivalry Down South", The New York Times</ref>

After resigning in early 1977, and starting a sports management company, Appel handled public relations for the New York Apples of World Team Tennis, a team featuring Billie Jean King and Vitas Gerulaitis. When the league folded, he joined the staff of Major League Baseball Commissioner Bowie Kuhn.

While serving as VP for Public Relations for New York City television station WPIX, he won an Emmy Award as the executive producer of Yankee telecasts, a position he held for 11 years until 1992.  He also produced pre-season football telecasts for the New York Giants and New York Jets.  In addition, Appel worked for the Atlanta Committee for the Olympic Games, The Topps Company, and assisted in handling public relations for the Israel national baseball team in the 2013 World Baseball Classic – Qualifier 1.

He is president of Marty Appel Public Relations, a New York-based public relations firm specializing in sports that he established in 1998. The PR agency includes as its clients largely ones in the world of sports, but it also has clients in publishing, education, consumer products, medicine, and not-for-profit.

Writing career
Appel has written over 20 books, including a biography of baseball player King Kelly, and children's biographies of Yankees Yogi Berra and Joe DiMaggio.  He ghost-wrote auto-biographical books for umpire Eric Gregg, TV and radio talk show host Larry King, baseball commissioner Bowie Kuhn, baseball executive Lee MacPhail, and baseball players Thurman Munson (Thurman Munson: An Autobiography; "It was Thurman’s book; he was free to leave out whatever he wanted," said Appel) and Tom Seaver, and wrote a biography of Munson (Munson: The Life and Death of a Yankee Captain) published in 2009, which was a New York Times bestseller.  His Now Pitching for the Yankees (2002) was ESPN's best New York baseball book of the year.

Appel's Pinstripe Empire: The New York Yankees from Before the Babe to After the Boss, published in 2012, was the first narrative history of the team since Frank Graham's 1943 book, The New York Yankees: An Informal History.  Former Yankee and author Jim Bouton described the book, in The New York Times, as: "good writing ... an insider’s history enlivened by a rich store of carefully researched anecdotes, most of which I’d never heard before ...  a marvelous book to take on vacation." Appel also wrote a children's version, Pinstripe Pride.

He wrote Casey Stengel: Baseball’s Greatest Character (Doubleday; 2017), a biography of colorful Hall of Fame player and manager Casey Stengel, nicknamed "The Old Perfessor".  Stengel  and Darryl Strawberry are the only people who have ever worn  the uniforms for all four New York City teams: the Dodgers, Giants, Yankees, and Mets.  He was the Yankees manager for 12 years, as they won seven World Series, and came out of retirement to manage the expansion Mets when he was 72 years old.

Appel served as Editor-at-Large for the National Baseball Hall of Fame and Museum's quarterly magazine, and helped write the text on the plaques of Hall of Fame inductees. He has contributed to publications including Sports Collectors Digest, Yankees Magazine, and Encyclopedia Americana''.

Boards of directors and honors
Appel served as a member of the Board of Directors for the Yogi Berra Museum and Learning Center, is a member of the Board of Trustees of the New York Sports Museum and Hall of Fame, and was a member of the Advisory Council to the Israel Baseball League.

In 2008, Appel was inducted into the National Jewish Sports Hall of Fame.  In 2015, the Larchmont Historical Society inducted former Larchmonter Appel into Larchmont Luminaries.

Personal
Appel is married to Lourdes Appel, whom he married in June 2009, with the service being performed by Larchmont, New York, Mayor Liz Feld with Rabbi Jeff Sirkman participating.  He has two children from a prior marriage, Brian and Deborah. He lived in Larchmont for 20 years, and also lived in Monsey, New York, in Riverdale, New York, and in Manhattan.

References

Further reading
 This chapter in Ruttman's history, based on a June 22, 2007 interview with Appel conducted for the book, discusses Appel's American, Jewish, baseball, and life experiences from youth to the present.

External links

Marty Appel Public Relations
 Casey Stengel: Baseball's Greatest Character by Marty Appel, Doubleday 2017

SABR interview
A Life in Pinstripes, Part 1
A Life in Pinstripes, Part 2

21st-century American non-fiction writers
1948 births
American male non-fiction writers
American television executives
Television producers from New York City
Baseball writers
Jewish American writers
Living people
New York Yankees executives
People from Larchmont, New York
Sports Emmy Award winners
Sportswriters from New York (state)
State University of New York at Oneonta alumni
Writers from Brooklyn
21st-century American male writers
21st-century American Jews